Bernt Østhus (born December 18, 1970) is a lawyer  and investor based in Trondheim, Norway. He graduated from University of Bergen in 1994 and has since worked mainly as a private equity investor.

Mr. Østhus served as the Chief Executive Officer of Notar Advokat until 1998 before becoming the Founder and Chief Executive Officer of Pretor Advokat AS until 2008.  Since January 2005, Mr. Østhus has served as a Managing Partner of Staur Holding AS, a family-owned investment company. He has held several Chairman of the Board positions in companies such as Petricore Ltd, Aqualyng Holding AS, Fram Exploration ASA and ResLab Reservoir Laboratories AS. He co-founded the Pareto Staur Energy Fund in 2011.

He co-founded the private equity fund Longship in 2015.

Bernt Østhus is a passionate Nature Photographer, and was awarded Norwegian Nature Photographer of the Year in 2014, 2016 and 2017. He won the 2012 "Norwegian Nature Photo of the Year" award. He is also awarded in international photo competitions, such as GDT Wildlife Photographer of the Year and NNPC.

In 2014, the Østhus family unanimously won a highly publicized arbitration case regarding the sale of Norsk Kylling to Rema 1000.

References

Living people
1970 births
Norwegian investors
People from Trondheim
University of Bergen alumni
20th-century Norwegian lawyers